Maurice Hope (born 6 December 1951) is a British former boxer, who was world junior middleweight champion. Born in Antigua, he grew up in Hackney, London. He represented Great Britain at the 1972 Summer Olympics in Munich, West Germany.

Boxing career

Amateur career
Maurice Hope was born in St. John's, Antigua, and moved at a very young age to the UK. Hope's aptitude towards boxing was evident early in childhood; he began to train as a very young boy. Hope went on to box at the 1972 Summer Olympics, where he would lose to German boxer János Kajdi in the quarter finals.

Professional career
Hope made his professional debut on 18 June 1973, defeating John Smith by decision in eight rounds at Nottingham.

On Hope's second fight, held on 25 September of that year, he scored his first knockout win, a victory in three rounds over Len Gibbs in Shoreditch. Hope won his first four professional fights.

On 21 November, he suffered his first defeat, being beaten by Mickey Flynn over eight rounds by decision.

After that loss, Hope went on to win five fights in a row, four by knockout, before winning his first regional belt, when he beat Larry Paul, 5 November 1974, by a knockout in round eight of a fifteen-round bout, at Wolverhampton, to win the British Jr. Middleweight title.

Hope then won three more fights, including one (a fourth-round knockout of Don Cobbs on 11 February 1975 at Royal Albert Hall) which was refereed by legendary referee Harry Gibbs, who also oversaw the refereeing of the Wilfredo Gómez-Carlos Zarate bout, among many other famous fights.

After these three wins, Hope went up in weight to fight for the vacant British Middleweight title, vacated by Kevin Finnegan, who, in turn, lost four times to Alan Minter. On 10 June, Hope was defeated by knockout for the first time, losing to Bunny Sterling in the eighth round for that regional title.

Hope's career took on an upwards movement after the loss to Sterling. He followed that loss with a knockout in a rematch against Larry Paul on 30 September at London's Empire Pool. This was the beginning of a four knockout win streak that took him to fight Tony Poole, 12 April 1976, for the vacant British Commonwealth Jr. Middleweight title. He won the regional belt by knocking out Poole in the twelfth round, and, after one more win, he met future world Middleweight champion Vito Antuofermo, on 10 October, at Rome, Italy, for the European Boxing Union's Jr. Middleweight title. Hope conquered his third regional title by knocking out Antuofermo (who would later last the full fifteen rounds in a fight with Marvin Hagler), in the fifteenth and last round. This bout was Hope's first fight abroad.

Having won three regional titles, Hope was ranked among the top Jr. Middleweight challengers by the WBC, and so, he obtained his first world title try, on 15 March 1977, against the WBC's world champion, Eckhard Dagge, in Berlin, Germany. After fifteen rounds, the fight was declared a draw (tie).

Hope regrouped with six wins in a row, before getting his second world title try. On 4 March 1979, he faced the then WBC world champion Rocky Mattioli in Sanremo, Italy. Hope became a world champion by knocking Mattioli out in the ninth round.

On 25 September, he defended the WBC's world title for the first time, knocking out Mike Baker in the seventh round, at London. His second defence, on 12 June 1980, was a rematch with Mattioli. This time, they fought in London, and Hope repeated his previous win, but with an eleventh round technical knockout instead. On 26 November, he defended his crown against well known Venezuelan contender Carlos Herrera in London, winning by a fifteen-round decision.

Hope went to Las Vegas, for his next defence, which also turned out to be his first, and, ultimately, last fight in the United States. He planned to marry his girlfriend while in Las Vegas. On 23 May 1981, at the Caesars Palace, Hope lost the world Jr. Middleweight title to Wilfred Benítez, suffering a twelfth-round knockout that later made television sports show highlights. While Benitez became the first Latin American to win world titles in three different divisions, the youngest boxer in history to do so, and the first in 40 years to achieve the accomplishment, Hope had to be hospitalised, but he recuperated and was able to marry his girlfriend before returning to England.

After one more defeat, to Luigi Minchillo, Hope permanently retired from boxing. Throughout his career Hope was managed by his mentor Terry Lawless, whose stable of top-quality boxers also included John H Stracey, Jim Watt, Charlie Magri and Frank Bruno. Their PR was handled by Norman Giller who, like all the boxers apart from Scottish hero Watt, was based in East London. They all trained in the famous East End fight academy run by Lawless at the Royal Oak in Canning Town. Most of their major fights were under the umbrella of leading London promotion team of Harry Levene, Mike Barrett and Mickey Duff.

Professional boxing record

Later life
Hope continued in the public eye in England, doing various jobs, and he has enjoyed his earnings as a boxer. Furthermore, with Benitez suffering from diabetes and boxing-related conditions, he has become a frequent visitor to Puerto Rico, where he and Benitez sometimes spend days talking about their old days as boxers. Hope now lives in Antigua after being given land by the government to mark his achievements in the ring. Hope has been an outstanding ambassador for Antigua and is happily involved in the island's tourist industry.

In recognition of Hope's achievements while a resident, the London Borough of Hackney named a major cycle route after him.

See also
List of world light-middleweight boxing champions
List of British world boxing champions
List of outright winners of the Lonsdale belt

References

External links

 

|-

1951 births
Living people
Antigua and Barbuda male boxers
People from St. John's, Antigua and Barbuda
Antigua and Barbuda emigrants to England
English male boxers
People from Hackney Central
Boxers from Greater London
Boxers at the 1972 Summer Olympics
Olympic boxers of Great Britain
Middleweight boxers
British Boxing Board of Control champions
Commonwealth Boxing Council champions
European Boxing Union champions
World light-middleweight boxing champions
World Boxing Council champions